Yantian District is one of the nine districts of the city of Shenzhen, Guangdong, China. It is adjacent to Shenzhen River and Hong Kong to the south, and is surrounded by Luohu, Longgang and Pingshan districts of Shenzhen.

Before 1960s, the northern part of the district belonged to Huiyang County (now Huiyang District, Huizhou). The famous Huizhou Uprising launched by Dr. Sun Yat-sen started in the northern part of the district during 1900. The failure of the revolution had inspired Dr. Sun to revolt against the Qing dynasty, which soon ended in 1912 after the Wuchang Uprising.

Due to the proximity to Bao'an County, Northern Yantian merged into the new County in 1960s. In 1978, after the establishment of Shenzhen Special Economic Zone(SEZ), Yantian (as a part of Luohu District), together with several other districts in Bao'an County, formed the new special economic district. In March 1998, Yantian separated from Luohu District after the construction of Yantian Port Area of Shenzhen Port.

Subdistricts

Located on Mirs Bay, Yantian is the location of some of Shenzhen's best-known tourist beaches, Dameisha and Xiaomeisha. Yantian Port Area is also located within the district.

Economy
Vanke is headquartered in Vanke Center in Dameisha, Yantian District.

Industrial zone
The Shenzhen Yantian Port Free Trade Zone was set up and approved by the State Council on September 27, 1996, with a total area of 0.85 square kilometer. On August 16, 2004, the project of "zone-port interaction" was approved by the State Council between Yantian Port Area and the Shenzhen Yantian Port Free Trade Zone.

Yantian Port Bonded Logistics Park was established with 0.96 square kilometer on December 30, 2005. The zone is situated near Yantian Port Area. Industries that are encouraged include printing/publishing/packaging, raw material processing, shipping/warehousing/logistics, and trading and distribution.

Tourist attractions
 Chung Ying Street()
 Wutongshan National Park
 Dameisha Beach
 Xiaomeisha Beach
 Shenzhen Xiaomeisha Sea World
 OCT East

Education

Schools operated by the Shenzhen Municipal Government
Shenzhen Foreign Languages School Senior High School Division

Transportation
The main bus routes covering Yantian District are shown on the table below, and Shenzhen Metro Line 8 also serves the area. Moreover, there is a ferry between Yantian Seafood Street and Nan'ao, Dapeng New District.

References

External links

 Yantian Government Online (English)
 Yantian Government Online (Chinese)

 
Districts of Shenzhen